Pierre L'Enfant (August 26, 1704 – June 23, 1787) was an 18th-century French painter whose son, Pierre Charles, designed the basic plan for Washington, D.C.

Biography 
L'Enfant was born in Anet on August 26, 1704. After studying under Charles Parrocel, he was admitted as an adémicien to the Royal Academy of Painting and Sculpture in 1745. His specialties were battle scenes and landscapes; his most famous of his paintings were those depicting the War of the Austrian Succession: especially a series of panoramas tracing the war in the Low Countries between 1744 and 1748. The Palace of Versailles has four of his paintings, Prise de Menin, Siège de Fribourg, Siège de Tournai, and Siège de Mons. He married Marie Charlotte Luillier. Together, they had Pierre Joseph (1752–1758), firstborn, died aged six, and Pierre Charles (1754–1825), designer of Washington, D.C. (capital city of the United States). He died in the Gobelins district of Paris on June 23, 1787.

References

External links 
  Pierre Lenfant in Joconde, a database of French painting. This Wikipedia entry relies heavily on the French Wikipedia entry, which was accessed for translation on November 9, 2016.

1704 births
People from Eure-et-Loir
1787 deaths
18th-century French painters
French male painters
18th-century French male artists